Gjerasim Qiriazi (18 October 1858 – 2 January 1894) was an Albanian Protestant preacher and educator. He is the founder of the Evangelical Church of Albania, (VUSH) Vëllazëria Ungjillore e Shqipërisë and the Kosovo Protestant Evangelical Church. He also founded the first Albanian school for girls in 1891 in Korçë, Albania, then part of the Ottoman Empire.

Biography

Qiriazi attended a Greek school of his native Manastir, Macedonia. He then went to Samokov, Bulgaria, to attend the Collegiate and Theological Institute. After he finished his studies, in 1883, he started to work for the British and Foreign Bible Society in Korçë.

On November 15, 1884, while traveling to Lake Ohrid, he was kidnapped by bandits, who held him for ransom for over a year. This episode was narrated by Gjerasim in Captured by Brigands and published after his death in English in 1901.

In 1889, he commissioned the printing of the book of Genesis and the Gospel of Matthew in Albanian Tosk, and the Gospel of Matthew in Aromanian, which were printed by "Dituria" in Bucharest on behalf of BFBS.

In 1891, the first Albanian school for girls in Korçë was founded by Qiriazi and his sister, Sevasti Qiriazi. He also had a younger sister, Parashqevi Qiriazi, who started to work at the girls' school when she was only 11.

He died at an early age from tuberculosis.

Works
In addition to Captured by Brigands, Qiriazi wrote an Albanian language grammar, poetry, songs and school books. A selection of his writings was published by his brother, Gjergj, in the collection Hristomathi a udhëheqës për ç'do shtëpi shqiptari (Monastir, 1902). Both brothers co-wrote the song collection Kënkë të shenjtëruara (Monastir, 1906).

Published Works
Captured by Brigands. London: Religious Tract Society, 1901 (repub. 2016, IAPS). Albanian versions: Pengu i kaçakëve (trans. Edmond Seferi). Tiranë: Kartë e Pendë, 1993; Tiranë: Vernon, 2016.
Katiqism i vogël, me prova nga Shkresa e Shenjtëruarë (translation of the Westminster Shorter Catechism with the Apostles' Creed). Manastir: Shtypëshkronja “Tregtare Nërkombëtare”, 1912.
Kënkëtore: Hymna për ndë Falëtoret të Ungjillorëvet (hectograph). Korçë: 1893.
Hristomathi më katër pjesë: gjëra të ndryshme e të vëgjejtura për këndim edhe për dobi të mësonjëtorevet shqipe, a udhëheqës për ç’do shtëpi shqipëtari, të gatuara edhe një pjesë nga dialogët të kthyera, prej një mëmëdhetari (edited and expanded by Gjergj Qiriazi). Sofia: Mbrothësia, 1902 (vol. 1) and 1907 (vol. 2). Republished 2023 (Tirana: ISSHP) as Krestomaci: udhëheqës për çdo shtëpi shqiptari ( and ).

Awards
 Mësuesi i Popullit (Teacher of the People) (Albania), 1987.
 Urdhri i Lirisë i Klasit të Parë (First Class Order of Freedom) (Albania), 1992.
 Nderi i Kombit (Honor of the Nation) (Albania), (2017).

References

Further reading
 Quanrud, John, Gerasim Kyrias and the Albanian National Awakening 1858-1894, Institute for Albanian and Protestant Studies, 2016, .
 Hosaflook, David. Lëvizja Protestante te shqiptarët, 1816–1908. Skopje: Instituti i Trashëgimisë Shpirtërore e Kulturore të Shqiptarëve, 2019, .
 Kyrias-Dako, Sevasti. My Life: The autobiography of the pioneer of female education in Albania. Tiranë: IAPS, 2022, .
Hosaflook, David, Persida Asllani etc. The Albanian Book and Protestant Enterprise: a 200-year Cultural Journey (Kolana “Rrugëtime kulturore: libri dhe feja në shqipëri”). Tiranë: Biblioteka Kombëtare e Shqipërisë, 2017, .

External links 
Development of the Protestant church amongst Albanians (Kosova Protestant Evangelical Church)
Biografia e Gjerasim Qiriazit (1858-1894) 

Converts to Protestantism from Eastern Orthodoxy
People from Bitola
1858 births
1894 deaths
Albanian educators
Albanian Protestants
Albanian evangelicals
Activists of the Albanian National Awakening
People from Manastir vilayet
19th-century Albanian people
Gjerasim